Nataliya Andriyivna Burdeyna (born 30 January 1974) is a Ukrainian archer.

Life
Burdeyna was born in Odessa in 1974.

Burdeyna was part of the Ukrainian team at the 2000 Summer Olympics, where they won the silver medal.  In the individual competition she finished 17th after losing the round of 32.

She again represented Ukraine at the 2004 Summer Olympics.  She placed 12th in the women's individual ranking round with a 72-arrow score of 643.  In the first round of elimination, she faced 53rd-ranked Sayoko Kawauchi of Japan.  Burdeyna, in a major upset, lost 137-129 in the 18-arrow match, dropping to 55th overall in women's individual archery.

Burdeyna was also a member of the 6th-place Ukrainian team in the women's team archery competition.

In 2005 she won a gold individual medal at the World Indoor championships.

References

External links
profile

1974 births
Living people
Ukrainian female archers
Archers at the 2000 Summer Olympics
Archers at the 2004 Summer Olympics
Olympic archers of Ukraine
Olympic silver medalists for Ukraine
Olympic medalists in archery
Medalists at the 2000 Summer Olympics
K. D. Ushinsky South Ukrainian National Pedagogical University alumni
Sportspeople from Odesa
21st-century Ukrainian women